Kutná Hora (medieval Czech: Hory Kutné) is a town in the Central Bohemian Region of the Czech Republic. It has about 20,000 inhabitants. The centre of Kutná Hora, including the Sedlec Abbey and its ossuary, was designated a UNESCO World Heritage Site in 1995 because of its outstanding architecture and its influence on subsequent architectural developments in other Central European city centres. Since 1961, the town centre is also protected by law as an urban monument reservation, the fourth largest in the country.

Administrative parts
The town is made up of twelve town parts and villages:

Kutná Hora-Vnitřní Město
Hlouška
Kaňk
Karlov
Malín
Neškaredice
Perštejnec
Poličany
Sedlec
Šipší
Vrchlice
Žižkov

Geography
It lies on the Vrchlice stream. The eastern part of the municipal territory lies in a flat agricultural landscape of the Central Elbe Table lowland.

History

Bronze Age and Iron Age
Archaeological finds show that the area around the Kaňk hill was populated by Celts during the Hallstatt and La Tène periods. At the Celtic settlement site between Libenice and Kaňk, numerous ceramic finds from the 5th–1st century BC were discovered in 1981. One of the most important finds is a smelting furnace with 10 kg of slag from the 2nd–1st century BC with traces of pyrrhotine, chalcopyrite, sphalerite and copper, which also testify to early underground mining in the Kaňk hill.

Establishment

The earliest traces of silver have been found dating back to the 10th century, when Bohemia already had been in the crossroads of long-distance trade for many centuries. Silver dinars have been discovered belonging to the period between 982 and 995 in the settlement of Malín, which is now a part of Kutná Hora.

The town began in 1142 with the settlement of Sedlec Abbey, the first Cistercian monastery in Bohemia. The Cistercian order based in the Sedlec Monastery was brought from the Imperial immediate Cistercian Waldsassen Abbey in Bavaria, Germany, close to the border with the Czech Republic. By 1260, German miners began to mine for silver in the mountain region, which they named Kuttenberg, and which was part of the monastery property. The name of the mountain is said to have derived from the monks' cowls (the Kutten) or from the word mining (kutání in old Czech).

Middle Ages
From the 13th to 16th centuries, the town competed with Prague economically, culturally, and politically. Under Abbot , the territory greatly advanced due to the silver mines which gained importance during the economic boom of the 13th century.

In 1300, King Wenceslaus II of Bohemia issued the new royal mining code  (also known as Constitutiones Iuris Metallici Wenceslai II). This was a legal document that specified all administrative as well as technical terms and conditions necessary for the operation of mines. Prague groschen were minted between 1300 and 1547/48.

In December 1402, the town was sacked by King Sigismund after the imprisonment of Wenceslaus IV. It was heavily defended by its residents. After several bloody skirmishes, Sigismund prevailed and forced the defenders to march to Kolín and kneel in subjugation. Although Sigismund was successful in his conquest, his hetman Markvart of Úlice died after being struck by an arrow during the siege on 27 December.

The town developed with great rapidity, and at the outbreak of the Hussite Wars in 1419 was the second most important town in Bohemia after Prague, having become the favourite residence of several Bohemian kings. It was here that, on 18 January 1409, Wenceslaus IV signed the famous Decree of Kutná Hora, by which the Czech university nation was given three votes in the elections to the faculty of Prague University as against one for the three other nations.

In 1420, Sigismund made the town the base for his unsuccessful attack on the Taborites during the Hussite Wars, leading to the Battle of Kutná Hora. Kutná Hora was taken by Jan Žižka, and after a temporary reconciliation of the warring parties was burned by the imperial troops in 1422, to prevent its falling again into the hands of the Taborites. Žižka nonetheless took the place, and under Bohemian auspices it awoke to a new period of prosperity.

Modern era
Along with the rest of Bohemia, Kuttenberg (Kutná Hora) passed to the Habsburg monarchy of Austria in 1526. In 1546, the richest mine was severely flooded. In the insurrection of Bohemia against Ferdinand I the town lost all its privileges. Repeated visitations of the plague and the horrors of the Thirty Years' War completed its ruin. Half-hearted attempts after the peace to repair the ruined mines failed; the town became impoverished, and in 1770 was devastated by fire. The mines were abandoned at the end of the 18th century.

In May 1742 during the First Silesian War, a Prussian force under Frederick the Great stopped in the town prior to the Battle of Chotusitz.

Bohemia was a crownland of the Austrian Empire in 1806, and remained controlled by the Austrian monarchy after the compromise of 1867. Until 1918, Kuttenberg was the capital of the district of the same name, one of the 94 Bezirkshauptmannschaften in Bohemia. Together with the rest of Bohemia, the town became part of the newly founded Czechoslovakia after World War I and the collapse of Austria-Hungary.

Kutná Hora was incorporated into the Protectorate of Bohemia and Moravia by Nazi Germany in the period 1939–1945, but was restored to Czechoslovakia after World War II. The town became part of the Czech Republic in 1993, after the dissolution of Czechoslovakia.

Demographics

Sights

Sedlec is the site of the Gothic Church of the Assumption of Our Lady and Saint John the Baptist and the famous Sedlec Ossuary. It is estimated that the ossuary is decorated with bones of more than 40,000 skeletons.

Among the most important buildings in the town are the Gothic, five-naved St. Barbara's Church, begun in 1388, and the Italian Court, formerly a royal residence and mint, which was built at the end of the 13th century.

The Gothic Stone House, which since 1902 has served as a museum of silver, contains one of the richest archives in the country. The Gothic Church of Saint James the Great, with its  tower, is another prominent building.

Other sights include:
Jesuit College
Plague Column
Church of St. John of Nepomuk
Church of Saint Ursula's Convent
Church of Saint Stephan in Malín

Notable people

Bohuslav Bílejovský (c. 1480–1555), historian and theologian
Jakob Jakobeus (1591–1645), Slovak writer
Václav Bernard Ambrosi (1723–1806), painter
Jan Erazim Vocel (1803–1871), poet, archaeologist and historian
Josef Kajetán Tyl (1808–1856), dramatist and writer, author of the national anthem
Antonín Lhota (1812–1905), painter and art teacher
Felix Jenewein (1857–1905), painter and illustrator
Gabriela Preissová (1862–1946), writer and playwright
Emanuel Viktor Voska (1875–1960), intelligence agency officer
Karel Domin (1882–1953), botanist and politician
Jaroslav Vojta (1888–1970), actor
Vera Prasilova Scott (1899–1996), Czech-American photographer and sculptor
František Zelenka (1904–1944), architect, graphic, stage set and costume designer
Jiří Orten (1919–1941), poet
Zbyněk Zbyslav Stránský (1926–2016), museologist
Radka Denemarková (born 1968), writer and translator
Alena Mills (born 1990), ice hockey player

Twin towns – sister cities

Kutná Hora is twinned with:

 Bingen am Rhein, Germany
 Eger, Hungary
 Fidenza, Italy
 Jajce, Bosnia and Herzegovina
 Kamianets-Podilskyi, Ukraine
 Kremnica, Slovakia
 Reims, France
 Ringsted, Denmark
 Stamford, England, United Kingdom
 Tarnowskie Góry, Poland

Gallery

See also
Jáchymov – another Bohemian silver mining town

References

External links

Photo Gallery of Kutná Hora and Travel Information

 
World Heritage Sites in the Czech Republic
Cities and towns in the Czech Republic
Populated places in Kutná Hora District
Mining communities in the Czech Republic